Nothing But Nets is a global, grassroots campaign of the United Nations Foundation to raise awareness and funding to fight malaria, a leading cause of death among children in Africa.

The campaign aims to prevent malaria deaths by purchasing, distributing, and teaching the proper use of mosquito bed nets to end malaria deaths in Sub-Saharan Africa. As of 2012, the campaign has distributed nets in twenty countries throughout Sub-Saharan Africa with current plans to expand into Kenya and Ethiopia.

Background
The UN Foundation and its partners use the money raised by donations to Nothing But Nets to fight malaria.  In conjunction with the Measles Initiative, a global vaccination effort to fight measles, Nothing But Nets purchases and distributes bed nets in countries and communities in greatest need.

Rick Reilly's 2006 column about malaria in Sports Illustrated, wherein he challenged his readers to donate at least $10 for the purchase of anti-malaria bed nets, brought the issue to national attention. Thousands of Americans across the country donated leading to the creation of the Nothing But Nets campaign.

Partnerships
The UN Foundation has partnered with groups as diverse as National Basketball Association’s NBA Cares, Major League Soccer WORKS, the people of the United Methodist Church, and Sports Illustrated to bring Nothing But Nets to the American public. These Founding Partners have been joined by corporate, multimedia, and financial partners to make a significant impact by raising awareness and funds to purchase and distribute bed nets to save lives. Recent significant partners have included the Bill and Melinda Gates Foundation and the Boy Scouts of America.  Stephen Curry of the Golden State Warriors is also a big advocate of Nothing But Nets.

See also
 Against Malaria Foundation
 Imagine No Malaria

References

External links
 Nothing But Nets
 United Nations Foundation

Health in Africa
Malaria organizations
Medical and health organizations based in Washington, D.C.
2006 establishments in the United States
2006 establishments in Washington, D.C.
Organizations established in 2006